Yanggu County is a county of western Shandong province, People's Republic of China, bordering the narrow strip of Henan province to the south. It is administered by the prefecture-level city of Liaocheng.

Administrative divisions
As 2012, this County is divided to 3 subdistricts, 10 towns and 5 townships.
Subdistricts
Bojiqiao Subdistrict
Qiaorun Subdistrict
Shizilou Subdistrict

Towns

Townships

Climate

References

External links
 Official home page

 
Yanggu
Liaocheng